M. S. M. Anandan is an Indian politician and was a member of the 14th Tamil Nadu Legislative Assembly from the Tiruppur North constituency.  He represented the All India Anna Dravida Munnetra Kazhagam party.

He was the Minister for Forests in the Government of Tamil Nadu.

The elections of 2016 resulted in his constituency being won by K. N. Vijayakumar.

Electoral performance

References 

Tamil Nadu MLAs 2011–2016
All India Anna Dravida Munnetra Kazhagam politicians
Living people
State cabinet ministers of Tamil Nadu
Year of birth missing (living people)
Tamil Nadu MLAs 2021–2026
Tamil Nadu politicians